John Mosby may refer to:

 John S. Mosby (1833–1916), Confederate army cavalry battalion commander
 John R. Mosby, member of the Industrial Workers of the World
 John Mosby, editor of the action entertainment magazine Impact